Posen is a village in Cook County, Illinois, United States. Posen is the German-language name for the western Polish city of Poznań. The population of the village was 5,632 at the 2020 census.

Geography
Posen is located at  (41.628234, -87.685723).

History

The area that is now Posen was settled by farmers, mainly of Dutch and German origin, in the second half of the 19th century. In 1893 a Chicago-based real estate firm hired 75 agents in the Polish-speaking areas of Germany to sell land to Poles seeking to emigrate to the United States. Over the next few years the village emerged as a place largely inhabited by factory workers, mainly employed at nearby Harvey, who also had room on their lots for gardens. In 1894 the Roman Catholic Archdiocese of Chicago established a mission to serve the Polish residents of Posen, which was elevated to parish status as St. Stanislaus the Martyr in 1898 (the church permanently closed in 2022).

In the 1930s the population of Posen was 98% of Polish origin, and in 1960 only 0.1% of the population was identified in the census as being not white, or 4 of the 4,513 inhabitants. In 1963 there were 7% black students that attended the Posen School. In 1990 Posen, having fallen to 4,226 inhabitants, was still 94.5% white, a large portion of this population being Polish. About 4% of the population identified as being both white and Hispanic, for an overall 7.3% or 310 people identifying as being Hispanic. In 2010 3,171 residents of Posen identified as Hispanic, representing the expansion of the Hispanic population to 10 times what it had been 20 years before (or an increase of more than 900% over 10 years). In the same time period the number of African American residents of the village increased from 60 (or 1.4% of the population) to 1,035. This means that the percentage rate of growth of the African American population of Posen over the last 20 years has been greater than that of the Hispanic population. While as late as 2004 the Encyclopedia of Chicago still referred to Posen as "predominantly Polish American" even then an actual examination of the 2000 census ancestry report would have shown that only a quarter of the population claimed to have Polish ancestry.

Demographics
As of the 2020 census there were 5,632 people, 1,796 households, and 1,186 families residing in the village. The racial makeup of the village was 26.35% White, 16.44% African American, 2.41% Native American, 0.60% Asian, 0.05% Pacific Islander, 38.81% from other races, and 15.32% from two or more races. Hispanic or Latino of any race were 61.40% of the population.

There were 1,796 households, out of which 78.45% had children under the age of 18 living with them, 51.00% were married couples living together, 9.02% had a female householder with no husband present, and 33.96% were non-families. 30.62% of all households were made up of individuals, and 8.52% had someone living alone who was 65 years of age or older. The average household size was 4.25 and the average family size was 3.21.

The village's age distribution consisted of 27.4% under the age of 18, 18.2% from 18 to 24, 21.7% from 25 to 44, 25.8% from 45 to 64, and 6.9% who were 65 years of age or older. The median age was 29.1 years. For every 100 females, there were 130.1 males. For every 100 females age 18 and over, there were 121.0 males.

The median income for a household in the village was $47,378, and the median income for a family was $63,068. Males had a median income of $21,956 versus $24,053 for females. The per capita income for the village was $17,927. About 8.9% of families and 10.6% of the population were below the poverty line, including 7.1% of those under age 18 and 5.3% of those age 65 or over.

Note: the US Census treats Hispanic/Latino as an ethnic category. This table excludes Latinos from the racial categories and assigns them to a separate category. Hispanics/Latinos can be of any race.

Government
Posen is in Illinois's 1st congressional district.

Education
Posen-Robbins School District 143½ serves Posen.

Notable person

 Don Kolloway, infielder for the Chicago White Sox, Detroit Tigers and Philadelphia Athletics; born in Posen

References

External links
Village of Posen official website

Villages in Illinois
Villages in Cook County, Illinois
Chicago metropolitan area
Populated places established in 1900
1900 establishments in Illinois
Majority-minority cities and towns in Cook County, Illinois